Mahsati Musayeva (born 3 April 1993) is an Azerbaijani former footballer who played as a goalkeeper. She has been a member of the Azerbaijan women's national team.

International career
Musayeva capped for Azerbaijan during the 2011 FIFA Women's World Cup qualification.

See also
List of Azerbaijan women's international footballers

References

1993 births
Living people
Azerbaijani women's footballers
Women's association football goalkeepers
Azerbaijan women's international footballers